Amr Mohamed  (عمر محمد, born 18 February 1974) is an Egyptian male water polo player. As a member of Egypt's national water polo team he competed at the 2004 Summer Olympics. At club level he played for Gezira Sporting Club in Egypt.

See also
 Egypt men's Olympic water polo team records and statistics
 List of men's Olympic water polo tournament goalkeepers

References

External links
 

1974 births
Living people
Egyptian male water polo players
Water polo goalkeepers
Water polo players at the 2004 Summer Olympics
Olympic water polo players of Egypt
Place of birth missing (living people)
21st-century Egyptian people